The Pleasant Hill Presbyterian Church, originally known as Mount Carmel Presbyterian Church, is a historic Greek Revival church in Pleasant Hill, Alabama.  The current structure was built between 1851 and 1852.  It features a distyle-in-antis type portico with simple box columns, a bell tower topped by a small domed cupola, and a second-floor balcony around three sides of the interior.  It was placed on the Alabama Register of Landmarks and Heritage on the November 2, 1990 and on the National Register of Historic Places on April 22, 1999.

See also
National Register of Historic Places listings in Dallas County, Alabama
Historical Marker Database

References

External links

South Dallas Historical Preservation Association Restoration of Pleasant Hill Presbyterian Church

National Register of Historic Places in Dallas County, Alabama
Properties on the Alabama Register of Landmarks and Heritage
Churches on the National Register of Historic Places in Alabama
Churches completed in 1852
19th-century Presbyterian church buildings in the United States
Presbyterian churches in Alabama
1852 establishments in Alabama